Sebastian Lange (born 16 October 1987) is a German former footballer.

External links

1987 births
Living people
German footballers
SC Paderborn 07 players
SC Wiedenbrück 2000 players
SC Verl players
3. Liga players
Regionalliga players
Association football goalkeepers
Sportspeople from Paderborn
Footballers from North Rhine-Westphalia